Henry Aldrich Plays Cupid is a 1944 American comedy film directed by Hugh Bennett and written by Muriel Roy Bolton and Val Burton. The film stars Jimmy Lydon, Charles Smith, John Litel, Olive Blakeney, Diana Lynn and Vaughan Glaser. The film was released in April 1944, by Paramount Pictures.

Plot
Henry plays matchmaker for Mr. Bradley (Vaughan Glaser), his principal and botany teacher at Central High, figuring that marital bliss might mellow the gruff educator and make it easier to get a passing grade and graduate. Bringing a woman into Bradley's life proves to be complicated, made more so by Mrs. Terwilliger (Barbara Jo Allen), a conniving spinster.

Cast 
Jimmy Lydon as Henry Aldrich
Charles Smith as Dizzy
John Litel as Mr. Aldrich
Olive Blakeney as Mrs. Aldrich
Diana Lynn as Phyllis Michael
Vaughan Glaser as Mr. Bradley
Barbara Jo Allen (also called Vera Vague) as "Blue Eyes" (Mrs. Terwilliger)
Paul Harvey as Sen. Caldicott

Critical response
The Owensboro Messenger called the film "fast-moving and laugh-provoking entertainment". Barbara Jo Allen (also called Vera Vague) "cavorts along with the Aldrich family to add to the merriment", the Kentucky newspaper said.

References

External links 
 

1944 films
American black-and-white films
Paramount Pictures films
American comedy films
The Aldrich Family films
1944 comedy films
1940s English-language films
Films directed by Hugh Bennett
1940s American films